Joe Seiwert (born August 21, 1951) is a Republican member of the Kansas House of Representatives, representing the 101st district.  He has served since 2009.  In 2017, the American Conservative Union gave him a lifetime evaluation of 77%. In 2022, during a public forum, Seiwet promulgated the litter boxes in schools hoax.

Committee membership
 Energy and Utilities
 Vision 2020
 Veterans, Military, and Homeland Security
 Economic Development and Tourism
 Local Government
 Joint Committee on Economic Development

Major donors
The top 5 donors to Seiwert's 2008 campaign:
1. Reno County Republican Cmte 	$7,500 	
2. Kansas Republican Party 	$2,250 	
3. Koch Industries 	$1,000
4. Sunflower Electric Power Corp 	$800 	
5. Kansas Insurance Agents 	$550

References

External links
 Official Website
 Kansas Legislature - Joe Seiwert
 Project Vote Smart profile
 Kansas Votes profile
 Campaign contributions: 2008

Republican Party members of the Kansas House of Representatives
Living people
1951 births
21st-century American politicians
University of Nebraska alumni
Friends University alumni
People from Reno County, Kansas